Lish (also called Lishpa or Khispi) is a Kho-Bwa language of West Kameng district, Arunachal Pradesh in India. It is closely related to Chug.

The Lish (population 1,567 in 1981) live in Dirang village, a few miles from Chug village, and in Gompatse. The Gompatse variety is not Lish proper, but is rather a lect closely related to Lish.

Lish is also spoken in Khispi village. Despite speaking languages closely related to Mey (Sherdukpen), the people identify as Monpa, not Mey.

According to Lieberherr & Bodt (2017), Lish is spoken by 1,500 people in 3 main villages.

References

Kho-Bwa languages
Languages of India
Endangered languages of India
Articles citing ISO change requests